Xiangxipus is an ichnogenus of dinosaur from ichnofamily Eubrontidae. Footprints of this dinosaur are found only in Cretaceous deposits of China in Xiangxi, Jiuquwan mine tracksite (HV). These deposits were dated at 99.7 to 66.043 Ma.

Xiangxipus was a ground dwelling carnivore.

Discovery and naming 
Ichnogenus Xiangxipus and all ichnospecies of this ichnogenus were described by Zeng in 1982 by footprints from Xiangxi. The genus name refers to the fact that footprints were found in Xiangxi.

Systematic 
Xiangxipus includes two ichnospecies:

 Xiangxipus chenxiensis
 Xiangxipus youngi

See also

 List of dinosaur ichnogenera

References

Dinosaur trace fossils
Prehistoric maniraptoriformes